Corey Jensen (born 8 January 1994) is an Australian professional rugby league footballer who plays as a  for the Brisbane Broncos in the NRL.

He previously played for the North Queensland Cowboys in the National Rugby League.

Background
Jensen was born in Townsville, Queensland, Australia and was raised in Bowen, Queensland.

He played his junior rugby league for the Bowen Seagulls and attending Bowen State High School. In 2011, Jensen moved to Townsville to attend Ignatius Park College.

Playing career

Early career
In 2010, Jensen played for the Townsville Stingers Cyril Connell Cup side and was selected for the Queensland under-16 team. In 2011, he moved up to the Stingers' Mal Meninga Cup side and toured England and France with the Australian Institute of Sport team, alongside future first graders Kodi Nikorima, Euan Aitken, Nene Macdonald and Brendan Elliot.

In 2012, Jensen started the season playing for the Stingers' Mal Meninga Cup side again before making his NYC debut for the North Queensland Cowboys. That year he was also selected for the Queensland under-18 team.

In 2015, after three seasons with the Cowboys' NYC side, Jensen joined the Townsville Blackhawks in the Queensland Cup. In 2016, he was selected for the Queensland Residents rugby league team and signed a one-year deal with the Cowboys, joining their NRL squad.

2017
After starting the season with the Townsville Blackhawks, Jensen made his NRL debut in Round, coming off the bench against the St George Illawarra Dragons. In Round 16, he scored his first NRL try in the Cowboys' 14-12 win over the Penrith Panthers. On 28 July, he re-signed with the Cowboys until the end of the 2019 season. On 1 October, Jensen started on the interchange in the Cowboys' 2017 NRL Grand Final loss to the Melbourne Storm. He ended his rookie season with 17 games and 1 try. On 6 October, he was named the Cowboys' Rookie of the Year.

2018
Jensen played 18 games for the Cowboys in 2018, starting at prop in Rounds 13 and 16.

2019
Jensen played just six NRL games in 2019, spending the majority of the season with the Townsville Blackhawks. In May, he was the vice-captain of the Queensland Residents side that defeated New South Wales Residents. On September 2, Jensen signed a two-year contract extension with the Cowboys.

2020
Jensen played eight NRL games in 2020, making appearances in Round 1 and Round 6 before returning to the side in Round 15.

2022
Jensen played a total of 18 games for Brisbane in the 2022 NRL season as the club finished 9th on the table.

Achievements and accolades

Individual
North Queensland Cowboys Rookie of the Year: 2017

Statistics

NRL
 Statistics are correct to the end of the 2020 season

References

External links
North Queensland Cowboys profile

1994 births
Living people
Australian rugby league players
North Queensland Cowboys players
Brisbane Broncos players
Rugby league props
Rugby league locks
Townsville Blackhawks players
Rugby league players from Townsville